The American Music Award for Favorite Song – Country (formerly known as Favorite Country Single 1974-1995) has been awarded since 1974. The category was retired for over a decade in 1995, before returning in the 2016 ceremony. Years reflect the year in which the awards were presented, for works released in the previous year (until 2003 onward when awards were handed out in November of the same year). The all-time winner for this category is Kenny Rogers with 5 wins, he is also the most nominated artist with 6 nominations.

Winners and nominees

1970s

1980s

1990s

2010s

2020s

Category facts

Multiple wins

 5 wins
 Kenny Rogers

 3 wins
 Willie Nelson
 Randy Travis

 2 wins
 Garth Brooks
 Dolly Parton
 Charlie Rich

Multiple nominations

 6 nominations
 Kenny Rogers

 5 nominations
 Alabama

 4 nominations
 Willie Nelson
 Dolly Parton
 Randy Travis

 3 nominations
 Garth Brooks
 The Judds
 George Strait

 2 nominations
 Glen Campbell
 Dan + Shay
 Vince Gill
 Loretta Lynn
 Tim McGraw
 Anne Murray
 The Oak Ridge Boys
 Charlie Rich

References

American Music Awards
Country music awards
Song awards
Awards established in 1974
1974 establishments in the United States
Awards established in 2016
Awards disestablished in 1995